Milecastle 23 (Stanley) was a milecastle of the Roman Hadrian's Wall. Its remains exist as a low, grass covered platform with traces of an external ditch (as Milecastle 25).

Construction 
Milecastle 23 was a long-axis milecastle.  The gateway type is unknown, though long-axis milecastles were thought to have been constructed by the Legio VI Victrix who were based in Eboracum (York).

The width of the south wall is unknown.

The ditch at the point corresponding to the milecastle's north gate undergoes a slight change in profile in the bottom.  Also, there is an  gap in the upcast mound at the same point.  These features indicate the existence of a causeway, later removed.  There was also evidence of an equivalent causeway across the vallum, and gaps in the vallum mounds (also removed).

Excavations and investigations
1930 – The milecastle was located by T Hepple and identified as a long-axis milecastle with broad east and west walls.  The traces of the milecastle ditch were also noted.
1952 – The corresponding part of the vallum was surveyed, and the possible previous existence of a causeway discovered.
1966 – English Heritage Field Investigation. The ditch was visible as a wide but superficial depression around the South, East and West sides.
1989 – English Heritage Field Investigation. The ditch was superficial but surveyable to the south and east. The possibility of the milecastle being a long-axis milecastle was restated.

Associated turrets 
Each milecastle on Hadrian's Wall had two associated turret structures.  These turrets were positioned approximately one-third and two-thirds of a Roman mile to the west of the Milecastle, and would probably have been manned by part of the milecastle's garrison.  The turrets associated with Milecastle 23 are known as Turret 23A and Turret 23B.

Turret 23A
No surface traces remain of Turret 23A (Stanley Plantation).  Its position was established in 1920, though its remains lie beneath the B6318 Military Road.

Location on Ordnance Survey 1:25 000 map:

Turret 23B
No surface traces remain of Turret 23B (Wall Fell).  Its position was established in 1920 purely by reference to the position of Turret 23A, though this cannot be confirmed as remains lie beneath the B6318 Military Road.

Location on Ordnance Survey 1:25 000 map:

Monument records

Public Access
Access to the mound marking the Milecastle is via the Hadrian's Wall Path National Trail.

References

Bibliography

External links 

23
Corbridge